Ilara may refer to:

 Ilara-Mokin, a town in Ondo State, Nigeria.
 Ilara-Ogudo Yewa, a town in Ogun State, Nigeria